is a Japanese footballer who plays for Japan Soccer College.

Club statistics
Updated to 23 February 2018.

References

External links

Profile at AC Nagano Parceiro
Profile at Azul Claro Numazu

1991 births
Living people
Nippon Sport Science University alumni
Association football people from Tokyo
Japanese footballers
J2 League players
J3 League players
Ehime FC players
AC Nagano Parceiro players
Azul Claro Numazu players
Association football forwards